The Polish People's Party of Wilno Land was a left-wing political party in the Republic of Central Lithuania. Following the 1922 general elections, it held 13 seats in the Sejm of Central Lithuania. Its ideology consisted of the agrarianism and agrarian socialism, and it supported the authonomy of Central Lithuania from Poland. Its leader was Bronisław Krzyżanowski.

Citations

Notes

References 

Political parties in the Republic of Central Lithuania
Political parties disestablished in 1922
Left-wing parties
Defunct agrarian political parties
Defunct socialist parties in Europe